Kauffman Motor Vehicle Company was a pioneer brass era, American automobile company, built in Miamisburg, Ohio, from 1909 until 1912.

History 
The company was begun in 1906 as the Kauffman Buggy Company, providing bodies and chassis for Hatfield, located across town. In 1908, as Hatfield ran into financial difficulties, the two firms merged, to form the Advance Motor Vehicle Company.

Under the Advance name, they introduced a four-passenger roadster with a refined version of Hartfield's four-cylinder on a 104 in (2642 mm) wheelbase. The Model C sold for US$1000,

Advance became the Kauffman Motor Car Company in 1911, and folded the next year.

Notes

Sources
Clymer, Floyd. Treasury of Early American Automobiles, 1877–1925. New York: Bonanza Books, 1950.
Kimes, Beverly Rae. The Standard Catalog of American Cars, 1805–1942. Iola, Wisconsin: Krause Publications, 1989. .

See also
List of automobile manufacturers
List of defunct automobile manufacturers

Motor vehicle manufacturers based in Ohio
Defunct motor vehicle manufacturers of the United States
1900s cars
Brass Era vehicles
Vehicle manufacturing companies established in 1906
Vehicle manufacturing companies disestablished in 1912
History of Ohio
Miamisburg, Ohio
Defunct companies based in Dayton, Ohio
1906 establishments in Ohio
1912 disestablishments in Ohio
1910s cars